The anti-Israel lobby is a term used by some to refer to organizations with the purpose of opposing relations between the United States and Israel.

Caroline Glick, managing editor of The Jerusalem Post, writes in an opinion column that recent years have seen "the emergence of a very committed and powerful anti-Israel lobby in Washington." However, critics of Israel's policies often object to the phrase “anti-Israel” being used in regards to such lobbying.

Organizations labeled members of the "anti-Israel lobby"

American Friends of the Middle East
Historian Paul Charles Merkley wrote in his 2001 book, Christian Attitudes Towards the State of Israel, that the American Friends of the Middle East, which was founded in 1951, "remains an active anti-Israeli lobby."

American-Arab Anti-Discrimination Committee
Martin J. Raffel identified the American-Arab Anti-Discrimination Committee (ADC) as being part of "The Anti-Israel lobby", hostile to the Jewish-American community in the late 1980s. The Jerusalem-based NGO Monitor identified it as "very active" in "anti-Israel political causes."

Council for the National Interest
Rafael Medoff, founding director of The David S. Wyman Institute for Holocaust Studies, labels the Council for the National Interest (CNI) as an organization that is part of the "anti-Israel lobby." CNI was founded following former Congressman Paul Findley's 1982 defeat by "pro Israel PAC money." CNI's website states its objective as "seeking to encourage and promote a U.S. foreign policy in the Middle East that is consistent with American values, protects our national interests, and contributes to a just solution of the Arab-Israeli conflict. It is CNI’s goal to restore a political environment in America in which voters and their elected officials are free from the undue influence and pressure of foreign countries and their partisans."

Other organizations
In 2008, The Jerusalem Post wrote that Wikipedia is "Part anarchy, part mob rule" and that "the 'mob' is the vast anti-Israel lobby that haters of our country have managed to pull together." The article focused on the negative reaction to the Committee for Accuracy in Middle East Reporting's Israeli lobby campaign in Wikipedia.

Caroline Glick wrote that the "anti-Israel Jewish lobby J Street," supported by several other Jewish groups "supports the White House's hostile positions on Israel as ends unto themselves." She also identifies George Soros as the individual who "first raised the prospect of a Jewish anti-Israel lobby in October 2006."

Individuals labeled members of the "anti-Israel lobby"
 Writing in his Foreign Policy blog, David Rothkopf lists former President of the United States Jimmy Carter and his former National Security Advisor Zbigniew Brzezinski as members of the "anti-Israel lobby", as well as "celebrity activists like Richard Gere, and many members of the media."
 Jeff Robbins, in The Wall Street Journal opinion piece, titled "Anti-Semitism and the Anti-Israel Lobby," writes that the billions of petrodollars Arab states spend in the U.S. for defense and business contracts have influenced U.S. politicians. He includes Edward Stettinius Jr., United States Secretary of State between 1944 and 1945, who at the time opposed American support for the creation of a Jewish state in the Middle East, stating, "It would seriously prejudice our ability to afford protection to American interests, economic and commercial . . . throughout the area."
 Medoff labels Pat Buchanan as an active leader of the anti-Israel lobby.

Criticism of the term 
Bret Stephens, foreign-affairs columnist of The Wall Street Journal and former editor of The Jerusalem Post, in a 2006 speech to the Chicago Friends of Israel student organization at the University of Chicago, criticized John Mearsheimer and Stephen Walt's The Israel Lobby and U.S. Foreign Policy for lumping together "the hugely disparate elements" of groups that support Israel and suggest they constitute a "lobby." To make his point, he described a hypothetical "anti-Israel lobby" made up of disparate groups, including such political opposites as Pat Buchanan and Noam Chomsky.

In 2008, University of Florida political scientist Ken Wald warned that the left leaning pro-Israel lobby group J Street "will get hammered and accused of being anti-Israel" by "more conservative pro-Israeli factions." The founder of J Street responded to such criticism of being "anti-Israel" saying that "the most pro-Israel thing any American politician or policy maker can do is help to bring about a two-state solution and a comprehensive peace agreement between Israel and her neighbours."

Barack Obama, during the 2008 election campaign, implicitly noted differences within the lobby in his comment that "there is a strain within the pro-Israel community that says, 'unless you adopt an unwavering pro-Likud approach to Israel, that you’re anti-Israel,' and that can’t be the measure of our friendship with Israel." Commentary magazine commented: "It was an odd choice of words—Likud has not been Israel’s governing party for more than three years—but what Obama clearly meant was that an American politician should not have to express fealty to the most hard-line ideas relating to Israel's security to be considered a supporter of Israel's."

See also
American Association for Palestinian Equal Rights
Anti-Zionism
Criticism of the Israeli government
Israel lobby in the United States
Jewish lobby
Opposition in the United States to the Israeli Occupation
Projects working for peace among Arabs and Israelis

References

Further reading 
 Barsky, Yehudit, "The Anti-Israel Lobby Today: An Examination of the Themes and Tactics of an Evolving Propaganda Movement", ADL Special Report, 1991.

External links
 U.S. Anti-Israel Activity portal of the Anti-Defamation League

Anti-Zionism in the United States
Arab-American organizations
Arab–American relations
Foreign policy political advocacy groups in the United States
Foreign policy lobbying organizations in the United States
United States–Middle Eastern relations
Israel–United States relations
State of Palestine–United States relations